"When the 'Yanks' Come Marching Home" is a World War I era song released in 1917. William Jerome wrote the lyrics. Seymour Furth composed the music. It was published by A.J. Stansy Music Co. of New York City. 

Artist Albert Wilfred Barbelle designed the sheet music cover. It features a group of smiling soldiers marching and a steam ship sailing away. There is also an inset photo that varies per edition. One version has a photo of Nora Bayes, who also performed the song. Another cover features William J. Reilly, USN, who also performed the song. The song was written for both voice and piano. The sheet music can be found at Pritzker Military Museum & Library.

The lyrics carry a hopeful tone, although it begins with soldiers off at war. The person speaking prays that God will keep them safe and that they come home soon. The chorus is as follows:

References

External links
 View the song MP3 and sheet music here

Songs of World War I
1917 songs
Songs with lyrics by William Jerome